The 18th American Society of Cinematographers Awards were held on February 8, 2004, honoring the best cinematographers of film and television in 2003.

Winners
 Outstanding Achievement in Cinematography in Theatrical Releases
 Seabiscuit – John Schwartzman
 Outstanding Achievement in Cinematography in Movies of the Week/Mini-Series/Pilot for Network or Basic Broadcast TV
 Hitler: The Rise of Evil – Pierre Gill
 Outstanding Achievement in Cinematography in Episodic TV Series
 Carnivàle (Episode: "Pick a Number") – Jeffrey Jur
 Outstanding Achievement in Cinematography in Movies of the Week/Mini-Series/Pilot for Basic or Pay TV
 Carnivàle (Episode: "Milfay") – Tami Reiker
 Special Achievement Award
 Kevin Brownlow
 Lifetime Achievement Award
 Michael Chapman
 Board of the Governors Award
 Irwin Winkler
 International Award
 Miroslav Ondříček
 President's Award
 Howard A. Anderson, Jr.

References

2003
2003 film awards
2003 television awards
2003 in American cinema
2003 in American television
2003 guild awards
2003 awards in the United States
February 2004 events in the United States